Byangum is a town located in north-eastern New South Wales, Australia, in the Tweed Shire.

Demographics

The median age of the Byangum population was 50 years, 13 years above the national median of 37.

75.8% of people living in Byangum were born in Australia. The other top responses for country of birth were New Zealand 4.5%, England 3.6%, Germany 1.8%, Philippines 1.2%, Indonesia 1.2%.

References 

Suburbs of Tweed Heads, New South Wales